This is a list of the Deputy Speakers of the Saeima, the parliament of Latvia. Currently, two Deputy Speakers of the Saeima are elected per convocation.

First Deputy Speaker of the Supreme Council of Latvia (1990-1993)

5th Saeima (July 6, 1993–November 6, 1995)

6th Saeima (November 7, 1995–November 1, 1998)

7th Saeima (November 2, 1998–November 4, 2002)

8th Saeima (November 5, 2002–November 6, 2006)

9th Saeima (November 7, 2006–November 1, 2010)

10th Saeima (November 2, 2010-2011)

References

Sources
Official website

Politics of Latvia
Latvia
Lists of political office-holders in Latvia
Legislative deputy speakers